Baldr, Baldur or Balder is a Norse god.

Baldur may also refer to:

Arts and media
 Baldur (album), by Icelandic band Skálmöld
Baldurs draumar (Baldur's Dreams), ballet by Norwegian composer Geirr Tveitt
Baldur Blauzahn, German comedy television series on WDR
 Baldur's Gate (city), fictional city in the Forgotten Realms role-playing game
 Baldur's Gate series, a series of computer role-playing games

Other
 Baldur, Manitoba, an unincorporated community
 Baldur (given name)
 ICGV Baldur (II), a naval trawler of the Icelandic Coast Guard

See also
Balder (disambiguation)